Mario Daniel Crnički (born 4 February 1998) is a Croatian professional footballer who plays as a forward for Regionalliga Bayern club Türkgücü München.

Career
At the age of 7, Crnički joined the youth academy of Bayern Munich, Germany's most successful clubs.

In 2018, he signed for Olympiakos Nicosia in the Cypriot Second Division after receiving interest from Hajduk, one of Croatia's most successful teams.

In 2019, Crnički was sent on loan to Mladost (Doboj Kakanj) in Bosnia and Herzegovina from FK Sarajevo, Bosnia and Herzegovina's most successful side, where he made 11 league appearances and scored two goals.

In 2020, he signed for Energie Cottbus in the German fourth division.

Crnički joined recently relegated Regionalliga Bayern club Türkgücü München on 3 September 2022.

References

External links
 

Living people
1998 births
Footballers from Munich
German people of Croatian descent
Croatian footballers
Association football forwards
Regionalliga players
Premier League of Bosnia and Herzegovina players
Cypriot Second Division players
FC Energie Cottbus players
FC Bayern Munich II players
FK Mladost Doboj Kakanj players
NK Čelik Zenica players
Olympiakos Nicosia players
Türkgücü München players
Croatian expatriate footballers
Croatian expatriate sportspeople in Cyprus
Expatriate footballers in Cyprus
Croatian expatriate sportspeople in Bosnia and Herzegovina
Expatriate footballers in Bosnia and Herzegovina
NK Dugopolje players
First Football League (Croatia) players